Asanga was a 4th-century Buddhist philosopher.

Asanga may also refer to:

Asanga, Nigeria geography.

people with the given name:
 Asanga Abeyagoonasekera, Sri Lankan writer
 Asanga Jayasooriya, Sri Lankan cricketer

Sinhalese masculine given names